Ogallala is a city in and the county seat of Keith County, Nebraska, United States. The population was 4,737 at the 2010 census. In the days of the Nebraska Territory, the city was a stop on the Pony Express and later along the transcontinental railroad. The Ogallala Aquifer was named after the city.

History
Ogallala first gained fame as a terminus for cattle drives that traveled from Texas to the Union Pacific railhead located there.  These trails are known as the Western or Great Western trails.  The Union Pacific Railroad reached Ogallala on May 24, 1867.  The city itself was not laid out until 1875 and not incorporated until 1884  The town's name comes from the Oglala Sioux tribe.

Geography
Ogallala is located at  (41.128806, -101.719460). Ogallala is in the US Mountain Time Zone (UTC−7/-6). Ogallala is close to Lake McConaughy, a large man-made lake and a state recreation area with sandy beaches, boating and swimming. The South Platte River runs through Ogallala.

Climate

Winters are cold, while summers are hot and often stormy. Precipitation is greatest in the late spring and summer, with winter being the driest part of the year.

Demographics

2010 census
As of the census of 2010, there were 4,737 people, 2,100 households, and 1,298 families living in the city. The racial makeup of the city was 94.6% White, 0.2% African American, 0.6% Native American, 0.4% Asian, 2.2% from other races, and 2.0% from two or more races. Hispanic or Latino of any race were 7.5% of the population.

There were 2,100 households, of which 27.5% had children under the age of 18 living with them, 48.0% were married couples living together, 9.6% had a female householder with no husband present, 4.2% had a male householder with no wife present, and 38.2% were non-families. 34.1% of all households were made up of individuals, and 14.6% had someone living alone who was 65 years of age or older. The average household size was 2.23 and the average family size was 2.85.

The median age in the city was 43.7 years. 23.6% of residents were under the age of 18; 6.8% were between the ages of 18 and 24; 21.4% were from 25 to 44; 28.3% were from 45 to 64; and 20.1% were 65 years of age or older. The gender makeup of the city was 48.8% male and 51.2% female.

2000 census
As of the census of 2000, there were 4,930 people, 2,052 households, and 1,339 families living in the city. The population density was 1,472.4 people per square mile (568.2/km). There were 2,314 housing units at an average density of 691.1 per square mile (266.7/km). The racial makeup of the city was 96.45% White, 0.02% African American, 0.87% Native American, 0.22% Asian, 1.68% from other races, and 0.75% from two or more races. Hispanic or Latino of any race were 4.79% of the population.

There were 2,052 households, out of which 31.5% had children under the age of 18 living with them, 53.0% were married couples living together, 9.5% had a female householder with no husband present, and 34.7% were non-families. 30.7% of all households were made up of individuals, and 14.7% had someone living alone who was 65 years of age or older. The average household size was 2.35 and the average family size was 2.94.

In the city, the population was spread out, with 26.5% under the age of 18, 6.7% from 18 to 24, 26.5% from 25 to 44, 21.9% from 45 to 64, and 18.4% who were 65 years of age or older. The median age was 39 years. For every 100 females, there were 89.0 males. For every 100 females age 18 and over, there were 85.0 males.

As of 2000 the median income for a household in the city was $32,141, and the median income for a family was $39,688. Males had a median income of $27,436 versus $18,292 for females. The per capita income for the city was $17,674. About 5.0% of families and 7.8% of the population were below the poverty line, including 9.3% of those under age 18 and 9.1% of those age 65 or over.

Education

Public schools
Ogallala is served by the Ogallala Public School District 
 High School—Ogallala High School
 Elementary and Middle School—Prairie View School (grade PK-8)

Private schools
 St. Paul's Lutheran School (PreK-5)
 St. Luke's Catholic School (PreK-5)

Media

Radio
 KOGA (AM) (930 AM) Adult Standards/MOR
 KOGA-FM (99.7 FM) Classic Rock
 KMCX (106.5 FM) Hot Country

Newspaper
 Keith County News (bi-weekly)

Point of interest
The Ogallala post office contains an oil-on-canvas mural, titled Long Horns, painted in 1938 by Frank Mechau. Murals were produced from 1934 to 1943 in the United States through the Section of Painting and Sculpture, later called the Section of Fine Arts, of the Treasury Department.

Notable people
 John Lanigan – longtime morning radio host at WMJI in Cleveland; National Radio Hall of Fame inductee
 Ken Schilz – Nebraska state senator 
 Thomas Shanahan – United States federal judge

References

External links

 City of Ogallala
 

Cities in Nebraska
Cities in Keith County, Nebraska
County seats in Nebraska
Populated places established in 1875
Pony Express stations
Boot Hill cemeteries